RejctX is an Indian web series that revolves around a group of students of an elite school, and millennial issues like gender fluidity, body shaming, personality disorders, and porn addiction, and their rap band. It was first launched for the ZEE5 network on 25 July 2019. The series stars Sumeet Vyas, Kubbra Sait, Ahmed Masi Wali, Ridhi Khakhar, Anisha Victor, Pooja Shetty and Ayush Khurrana as the primary cast.

Cast

Season 1
 Sumeet Vyas as Farhan Hussain
 Kubbra Sait as Anushka Rao
Ahmed Masi Wali as Aarav Sharma
 Anisha Victor as Kiara Tiwari
 Ridhi Khakhar as Parnomitra Rai
 Talay Sanguandikul as Steve
 Sumeet Vyas

Season 2 
 Sumeet Vyas as Farhan Hussain
 Ahmed Masi Wali as Aarav Sharma and Jai Krishna/Jackie (dual role)
 Anisha Victor as Kiara Tiwari
 Ridhi Khakhar as Pornomitra Rai
Esha Gupta as Rene Ray
 Saadhika Syal as Sehmat Ali
 Prabhneet Singh as Harwinder Sandhu
 Ayush Khurana as Maddy
 Pooja Sundar Shetty as Misha Patel
 Tanvi Shinde as Yesha Tiwari
 Khalid Siddiqui as Prithviraj Sharma
 Shaan Groverr as Sid

Release 
RejctX was released on 25 July 2019, and a private screening was also held for the same, which witnessed celebrities like Sonali Bendre, Sussanne Khan, Kunal Kapoor among others, upon release RejctX was received positively and became a quick hit.

Season 2 
In late 2019, ZEE5 renewed the show for Season 2 with Goldie Behl set to return as the show runner. The season 2 of RejctX was released on 14 May 2020, but the web series leaked on the piracy giants like Tamil Rockers on the very next day of release.

Episodes

Season 1

Season 2

References

External links 
 

Hindi-language web series